The Old Rectory is a Grade II* listed building located in the centre of Stanwick in North Northamptonshire, close to the parish church.

History
The Old Rectory was rebuilt in 1717 by Sir James Burrough (1691–1764) for the local rector, Dr. Peter Needham (1680–1731) and cost £1,000.  It was described by Doctor Richard Cumberland in his memoirs as being a handsome square of four equal fronts, built of stone, containing four rooms on a floor, with a gallery running through the centre.

References 

Buildings and structures in Northamptonshire
North Northamptonshire